Roy Alexander "Red" Parnell (September 17, 1905 - February 16, 1954) was an American left fielder and manager in Negro league baseball, most notably with the Philadelphia Stars from 1936 to 1943. Born in Austin, Texas, he died at age 48 in Philadelphia.

In his rookie year in the Negro National League in 1927, he batted .422 in 87 games, which was the best among the league batters (he also led the league in hits with 141). In 1932, playing with Memphis of the NSL, he led the league in doubles (12), triples (11), and runs batted in (50). Parnell also tried his hand at pitching, appearing in at least one game in four seasons. He had played in just four games at pitcher before 1932, but he was sent to pitch seven for the Red Sox that year (with six starts), and he responded with five complete games and two shutouts for a 5-1 record in 54 innings pitched. He had an ERA of 0.83, which led the Negro Southern League. He appeared in just one further game at pitcher in 1940 for Philadelphia, allowing three runs in seven innings in a loss. He played thirteen seasons on and off in the Negro leagues (1927–28, 1932, 1934-1943) with four different teams.

References

External links
 and Baseball-Reference Black Baseball stats and Seamheads
Negro League Baseball Museum
Biography from Center for Negro League Baseball Research

1905 births
1954 deaths
Birmingham Black Barons players
Columbus Elite Giants players
Houston Buffaloes players
Monroe Monarchs players
Nashville Elite Giants players
Negro league baseball managers
New Orleans Algiers players
New Orleans Crescent Stars players
Philadelphia Stars players
Baseball players from Austin, Texas
Baseball outfielders
20th-century African-American sportspeople